Musa Okwonga (born 11 October 1979) is a British author, podcaster, and musician.

Early life and education 
Okwonga's parents, medical students, fled Uganda under Idi Amin's dictatorship and settled in the UK. He is the eldest of four children who were all brought up by their mother after their father died. Okwonga's father was killed aged 40 in a helicopter crash. His mother worked as a doctor. 

Between 1993 and 1998, Okwonga attended Eton College, where he received a scholarship towards his fees. In 1998, he matriculated at St John's College, Oxford, reading Jurisprudence for three years.

Okwonga has also worked as a football journalist and the co-host of Stadio, a football podcast on the Ringer podcast network, Stadio. Since 2014, he has resided in Berlin.

Publications 

 One of Them: An Eton College Memoir, Unbound, 2021, 
 In The End, It Was All About Love, Rough Trade Books, 2021, 
 Raheem Sterling (Football Legends #1), Scholastic, 2020, 
 The Ungrateful Country, in The Good Immigrant, 2016, 
 Will You Manage? The Necessary Skills to Be a Great Gaffer, Serpent's Tail, 2010, 
 A Cultured Left Foot, Duckworth overlook, 2007,

References 

1979 births
Living people
Alumni of St John's College, Oxford
New Statesman people
People educated at Eton College
Black British writers
Writers from London
English people of Ugandan descent
English sportswriters
LGBT Black British people

British bisexual writers
Bisexual musicians